Kibbutz Lotan is a Reform kibbutz in southern Israel. Located in the Arabah Valley in the Negev desert, it falls under the jurisdiction of Hevel Eilot Regional Council. The kibbutz is a member of the Israel Movement for Reform and Progressive Judaism and the Global Ecovillage Network.

History
The kibbutz was founded in 1983 by idealistic Israeli and American youths who together built a profit sharing community based on pluralistic, egalitarian and creative Jewish values while protecting the environment. The name of the kibbutz derives from "one of the sons of Seir the Horite". (a descendant of Esau, who lived in Edom nearby).

Economy
Income is generated by growing Medjool and Dekel Noir dates, dairy cows for milk and goats for cheese production, member's incomes from work throughout the region and ecotourism including birdwatching and holistic health – in particular watsu – water shiatsu – treatments and courses.

The kibbutz's Center for Creative Ecology is an environmental education, research and conservation institution. The Center offers academic programs in conjunction with the University of Massachusetts Amherst and certification courses in permaculture, sustainable design and training. Facilities include an interactive park for organic and urban agriculture, natural building and solar energy demonstrations as well as the energy-efficient EcoCampus, a neighborhood constructed from earth-plastered straw bales.

References

External links
Kibbutz Lotan Official website
Kibbutz Lotan Desert Inn Official website

Kibbutzim
Kibbutz Movement
Populated places established in 1983
Populated places in Southern District (Israel)
Reform Judaism in Israel
1983 establishments in Israel
Reform Zionism